Çiğdem Dede (born February 27, 1980, in Gaziantep, Turkey) is a Turkish powerlifter competing in the −44 kg division. She won the silver medal at the 2012 Paralympics. She is a dwarf athlete of Ankara Guven Spor, where she is coached by Mustafa Doğan.

She became paralyzed at the age of six due to wrong injection given to her leg.

Career history
Çiğdem Dede is high school graduate. She began powerlifting by chance, encouraged by a weightlifting coach in 2009, and then received the support of her family. That year, Dede ranked fourth at the IPC World Championship. She became national champion in 2010 and 2011. At the 2011 Fazaa International Powerlifting Tournament in Dubai, United Arab Emirates, she took the gold medal lifting 100.0 kg.

Achievements

References

1980 births
Living people
Sportspeople from Gaziantep
Turkish powerlifters
Paralympic powerlifters of Turkey
Powerlifters at the 2012 Summer Paralympics
Paralympic silver medalists for Turkey
21st-century Turkish sportswomen
Sportspeople with dwarfism
Medalists at the 2012 Summer Paralympics
Female powerlifters
Paralympic medalists in powerlifting